The Australasian College Broadway is a private college in Sydney, Australia, offering training in beauty, make-up, and hairdressing skills. It was founded by Maureen Houssein-Mustafa OAM in 1994, and placed into administration on 23 December 2016. In 2015, the college earned more than $10.4 million from taxpayer funded loans.

This college is located in the Sydney suburb of Glebe, New South Wales. It spans 8,000 square metres and has capacity for 1,000 students. On December 23, the College had 800 enrolled students, however according to Federal Department of Education data, only 73 students graduated.

In 2000, the college became the first private Registered Training Organisation to receive the Training Provider of the Year award from the NSW Department of Education and Training.

The college is the subject of a NSW Police investigation surrounding allegations that the college, its Chief Financial Officer (Daniel Osborne), and its founder, Mrs. Houssein-Mustafa OAM, claimed federal training loans for under-skilled graduates. The police investigation continues whilst forensic accountants audit the records of the Company.

The Australasian College Broadway was a finalist in the 2009 Telstra Business of the Year Awards in New South Wales.

References

External links
 The Australasian College Broadway website
 The Australasian College Broadway Facebook page
 The Australasian College Broadway Instagram profile

Australian vocational education and training providers
Educational institutions established in 1994
Education in Sydney
1994 establishments in Australia